The unicolored jay (Aphelocoma unicolor) is an Aphelocoma jay native to cloud forests of northwestern Central America and southern and southeastern Mexico, from central Honduras west to central Guerrero, southern Veracruz and extreme southern San Luis Potosí. It is apparently a basal member of its genus (Rice et al. 2003). At Montebello, Chiapas, it is a cooperative breeder (Webber and Brown 1994).

References
Rice, Nathan H.; Martínez-Meyer, Enrique & Peterson, A. Townsend (2003): Ecological niche differentiation in the Aphelocoma jays: a phylogenetic perspective. Biol. J. Linn. Soc. 80(3): 369–383.  PDF fulltext
Webber, T., and Jerram L. Brown. 1994. Natural History of the Unicolored Jay in Chiapas, Mexico. Proceedings of the Western Foundation of Vertebrate Zoology 5(2):135-160.
Webber, T., and Nancy G. Stotz. 2019. Vocalizations of Unicolored Jays (Aphelocoma unicolor) at Montebello, Chiapas, Mexico. Bulletin of the Florida Museum of Natural History 57 (1): 1-75.

Footnotes

External links
CONABIO: Unicolored jay drawing. Retrieved 2007-FEB-26.
Article with unicolored jay
RangeMaps & synopsisInfoNatura NatureServe 
Picture; Article
Unicolored jay photo gallery VIREO

Aphelocoma
Birds of Mexico
Birds of El Salvador
Birds of Guatemala
Birds of Honduras
Birds described in 1847
Taxa named by Bernard du Bus de Gisignies
Birds of the Sierra Madre del Sur